Hotchkin is a surname which originates from ancient Anglo-Saxon tribes of Britain and means the son of Hodge.

People with the name Hotchkin include:
 Allan Hotchkin (born 1943), Australian rules footballer
 Jason Hotchkin (born 1978), American soccer player
 Neil Hotchkin (1914–2004), English first-class cricketer
 Stafford Hotchkin (1876–1953), English soldier, politician and High Sheriff of Rutland

See also 
 Hodgkin

References